Estherton is an unincorporated area in Dauphin County, Pennsylvania, United States, and a part of the Harrisburg-Carlisle area. It is situated on the Susquehanna River, just north of the city of Harrisburg and above Montrose Park in Susquehanna Township. The area is served by the Harrisburg post office, with the zip code of 17110. Interstate 81 runs through the community to the George N. Wade Memorial Bridge.

Estherton was founded as Coxestown, or Coxtown, in 1764 by John Cox Jr. after his wife, Esther. It was the second town laid out in Dauphin County, after Middletown.

External links 
 Map of Estherton
 Susquehanna Township Map

References

Harrisburg–Carlisle metropolitan statistical area
Unincorporated communities in Dauphin County, Pennsylvania
Unincorporated communities in Pennsylvania